Sarah Louise Rowell (born 19 November 1962) is a British former long-distance runner. Born in Hostert, North Rhine-Westphalia, Germany, she ran 2:39:11 at the age of 20 at the 1983 London Marathon. Later that year she won the gold medal in the women's marathon at the 1983 Universiade in Edmonton. At the 1984 London marathon she improved her best to 2:31:28 to qualify for the British team for the 1984 Los Angeles Olympics. In the inaugural women's Olympic marathon, she finished 14th. She broke the British record when running her personal best for the marathon with 2:28:06, when finishing second behind Ingrid Kristiansen at the 1985 London Marathon.

Later in her running career, Rowell was a prominent fell runner, winning the Three Peaks Race four times as well as Wasdale, Borrowdale and Ben Nevis. She finished second in the 1992 World Mountain Running Trophy and won both the British and English Fell Running Championships in 1995 and 1996.

Achievements

References

1962 births
Living people
Sportspeople from Düsseldorf (region)
British female long-distance runners
English female long-distance runners
British fell runners
British female marathon runners
English female marathon runners
Olympic athletes of Great Britain
Athletes (track and field) at the 1984 Summer Olympics
Universiade medalists in athletics (track and field)
British female mountain runners
Universiade gold medalists for Great Britain
Medalists at the 1983 Summer Universiade
People from Viersen (district)